Lü Jianzhong (born 6 February 1982), better known by his stage name Tank, is a Taiwanese singer-songwriter. He is currently signed to HIM International Music. His debut album, Fighting (Fighting, The Law of Surviving) was released on 23 February 2006. His latest album, The 3rd Round, was released on 31 May 2009.

Biography
Lü was born in Taitung, Taiwan. He is a native Taiwanese: his father is from the Ami people, while his mother is Puyuma. Tank married his girlfriend of two years, MerMer, on 28 September 2012. The wedding was originally planned for the end of 2011 but was postponed due to the unexpected arrival of their daughter, Hua Hua, who was born in May 2012.

Tank also suffers from congenital heart disease. He suffered a heart attack on 26 December 2007, and his sister died from a sudden heart attack in December 2006, and his aunt died also from a heart attack several months later. In 2009, he had a cardioverter-defibrillator implanted to regulate his heart beat.

Before releasing his debut album, Lü helped write songs for Vic Chou and S.H.E, among many other artists. He wrote the music and lyrics for track "Letting You Go", which was released by Taiwanese artist Will Pan in his third album Wu Ha. By the age of 21, he was already recognized for composing more than 200 songs. He was said to be the next big thing after David Tao and Jay Chou for his talents in composing songs, singing and dancing.

Two songs he composed, "Romance of Three Kingdoms" and "Give Me Your Love", became ending themes of Seven Swordsmen and KO One respectively. Another song, "Tears of a Thousand Years", was used as an ending theme for the drama serial The Little Fairy. His second album Keep fighting (Keep fighting, The Extended Battle) was released on 19 January 2007. "Personal Angel" was used for an ending theme of Hanazakarino Kimitachihe, a romantic comedy series. He was later requested by NCsoft to compose the theme song for the computer game, Guild Wars.  "Intense Battle" became the theme song for that game. In 2007, he recorded a song with his junior, Yoga Lin of Xing Guang Bang, for the idol series Bull Fighting with the same name. He sang a duet in 2012 with Ella Chen from S.H.E from her E.P Wǒ jiùshì ( called Dǒng wǒ zài ài wǒ which was also used in the soundtrack for her movie with Mike He <Bad Girl>.

Discography

Studio albums

Soundtrack contributions

Awards and nominations

Note

References

External links
 Tank@HIM International Music
 Tank's blog

1982 births
Amis people
Living people
Puyuma people
Taiwanese Mandopop singer-songwriters
People from Taitung County
21st-century Taiwanese male singers